The siege of Veprik took place on 3–18 January 1709 during the Swedish invasion of Russia in the Great Northern War. 

After the unusually cold winter, many troops had died from both armies and Charles XII of Sweden decided to lay siege to the Russian city of Veprik to put pressure on Tsar Peter I of Russia. The town was defended by a garrison of about 1,500 men. After the Russian commander, the Scot Colonel Fermor refused to surrender, Charles XII started a bombardment of the town and later, on 17 January also an assault. After about two hours of intense fighting the Swedes pulled back, unable to capture the town. However, the Russians surrendered on the night of 18 January and the Swedes were allowed to march in. The result was a tactical success for the Swedish forces, but did not greatly alter the strategic situation. About 400 Swedes were killed and another 600 wounded. The whole Russian garrison was either killed, captured or wounded. After several days Charles XII burnt down the town.

References

 Bengt Liljegren (2000). Karl XII: En biografi. Lund: Historiska Media. pp. 167.
 Peter From (2007). Katastrofen vid Poltava - Karl XII:s ryska fälttåg 1707-1709. Lund: Historiska Media. pp. 251. 

Veprik
Veprik
Veprik
Veprik
Veprik